Juan Gisbert Sr. (born 5 April 1942) is a retired amateur and professional tennis player from the 1960s and 1970s.

He won one ATP singles title (plus at least three others before the Open era) and reached the finals at the Australian Championships in 1968 and Cincinnati in 1971.

Grand Slam finals

Singles: 1 (0–1)

Grand Slam tournament performance timeline

Singles

Open era career finals

Singles (1 title, 6 runner-ups)

Doubles (21 titles, 17 runner-ups)

External links
 
 
 

1942 births
Living people
Tennis players from Catalonia
Spanish male tennis players
Tennis players from Barcelona
Tennis players at the 1968 Summer Olympics
Universiade medalists in tennis
Mediterranean Games gold medalists for Spain
Mediterranean Games silver medalists for Spain
Mediterranean Games medalists in tennis
Competitors at the 1967 Mediterranean Games
Competitors at the 1971 Mediterranean Games
Universiade gold medalists for Spain